The 2008–09 Western Football League season (known as the 2008–09 Toolstation Western Football League for sponsorship reasons) was the 107th in the history of the Western Football League, a football competition in England. Teams were divided into two divisions; the Premier and the First.

The league champions for the first time in their history were Bitton, although it was runners-up Frome Town who took promotion to the Southern League. The champions of Division One were Larkhall Athletic.

Premier Division
The Premier Division featured two new clubs in a league of 21 after Truro City were promoted to the Southern League, and Odd Down were relegated to the First Division:

Sherborne Town, runners up in the First Division.
Wellington, champions of the First Division.

Final table

First Division
The First Division featured three new clubs in a league of 20, reduced from 21 the previous season after Wellington and Sherborne Town were promoted to the Premier Division, Backwell United resigned and Weston St Johns were relegated. Both the latter two clubs joined the Somerset County League.

Odd Down, relegated from the Premier Division.
Gillingham Town, promoted as runners-up in the Dorset Premier Football League.
Wells City, promoted as runners-up in the Somerset County League.
Portishead F.C. changed their name to Portishead Town F.C.

Final table

References
 League tables

External links
 Western League Official Site

2008-09
9